Thomas Worley Stewart (April 1881 – 3 November 1955) was an English professional football full back who played in the Football League for Clapton Orient and Sunderland.

Career statistics

References

1881 births
1955 deaths
Footballers from Sunderland
English footballers
Association football fullbacks
Sunderland Rovers F.C. players
Sunderland A.F.C. players
Portsmouth F.C. players
Brentford F.C. players
Leyton Orient F.C. players
Brighton & Hove Albion F.C. players
Wingate Albion F.C. players
English Football League players
Southern Football League players